Amanpur is a town and a nagar panchayat in Kasganj district  in the state of Uttar Pradesh, India.

Demographics
 India census, Amanpur had a population of 9117. Males constitute 52% of the population and females 48%. Amanpur has an average literacy rate of 49%, lower than the national average of 59.5%; with 61% of the males and 39% of females literate. 20% of the population is under 6 years of age. Now It belongs to newly created district Kasganj.

References

Cities and towns in Kasganj district